Josep Pintat Solans (January 21, 1925 – October 20, 2007) was the prime minister of Andorra.  

A local business executive, he was unanimously elected prime minister by the General Council of Andorra and began serving on May 21, 1984; Pintat Solans was re-elected in January 1986, receiving the votes of 27 out of 28 of the General Council's members, serving as Prime Minister until January 12, 1990.  

He died on October 20, 2007, after a long illness.

References 

Heads of Government of Andorra
1925 births
2007 deaths
Andorran businesspeople
20th-century businesspeople